Kasperczyk is a Polish surname. Notable people with the surname include:

 Robert Kasperczyk (born 1967), Polish footballer and manager
 Susanne Kasperczyk (born 1985), German footballer

Polish-language surnames